Hertekamp was a Belgian professional cycling team that existed from 1970 to 1973. The team participated in the Giro d'Italia in 1970 and 1971 and the 1971 Vuelta a España. Jean Ronsmans won the 4th stage of the latter. The road team folded after 1973, and converted to a cyclo-cross team, which existed until 1988.

References

Cycling teams based in Belgium
Defunct cycling teams based in Belgium
1970 establishments in Belgium
1973 disestablishments in Belgium
Cycling teams established in 1970
Cycling teams disestablished in 1973